Hranitne is a village in Volnovakha Raion (district) in Donetsk Oblast of eastern Ukraine.

The village is situated on the right bank of Kalmius river that became the boundary between Donetsk People's Republic-controlled territory on the east bank of the river, and Ukrainian government-controlled territory on the west bank, after an offensive by the pro-Russian forces of the Donetsk People's Republic in August 2014 during the War in Donbass.

The war has brought along both civilian and military casualties. On 26 February 2016 the spokesman of the Presidential Administration on issues related to ATO reported that one Ukrainian serviceman was killed in the village the previous day.

Demographics
The population consists mainly of Urums (turkic - speaking greeks), who migrated there from the Crimean peninsula in the end of the 18th century.

References

External links

 Weather forecast for Hranitne

Villages in Volnovakha Raion